Wild pear may refer to:

 European pear, Pyrus communis
 European wild pear, Pyrus pyraster
 South African wild pear, Dombeya rotundifolia